The 2007 Men's Pan-American Volleyball Cup was the second edition of the annual men's volleyball tournament, played by seven teams from North American countries from June 1 to June 9, 2007 in Santo Domingo, Dominican Republic. The event served as a qualifier for the 2008 America's Cup in Brazil. The winner of each pool automatically advanced to the semi-finals and the teams placed in second and third met in crossed matches in the quarterfinals round. Mexico win the event.

Competing nations

Squads

Preliminary round

Group A

Sunday June 3

Monday June 4

Tuesday June 5

Group B

Sunday June 3

Monday June 4

Tuesday June 5

Final round

Quarterfinals
Wednesday June 6, 2007

Classification
Thursday June 7, 2007 — Fifth Place Match

Thursday June 7, 2007 — Sixth Place Match

Semi-finals
Thursday June 7, 2007

Finals
Friday June 8, 2007 — Bronze Medal Match

Friday June 8, 2007 — Gold Medal Match

Final ranking

Mexico, Puerto Rico and Cuba qualified for the 2008 America's Cup

Awards

Most Valuable Player
  José Martell
Best Spiker
  Yadier Sánchez
Best Scorer
  Yadier Sánchez
Best Defender
  Ángel Matías
Best Setter
  Fernando Morales
Best Server
  Mark Dodds
Best Libero
  Amaury Martínez
Best Blocker
  Raidel González

References

 Results 

Men's Pan-American Volleyball Cup
P
Volleyball
2007 in Dominican Republic sport